The Linnean Gold Medal is a medal awarded by the Linnean Society of London in "special circumstances" for "services to the Society". As the society's highest honour it has, to date, only been awarded three times.

Gold Medallists 

 Doris Kermack (1988) (palaeontologist and marine zoologist)
 David F. Cutler PPLS (1999) (botanist and plant anatomist)
 Grenville Llewellyn Lucas (2007) (Keeper of the Herbarium of the Royal Botanic Gardens at Kew)

External links
 The Linnean Gold Medal website

References

British science and technology awards